Blackiston is an unincorporated community in Kent County, Delaware, United States. Blackiston is at the intersection of state routes 6 and 42, west of Clayton and northwest of Kenton.

References

Unincorporated communities in Kent County, Delaware
Unincorporated communities in Delaware